Balmattum is a closed station located in the township of Balmattum, on the North East railway in Victoria, Australia. It had a single platform on the eastern side of the broad gauge line, with the standard gauge running behind.

The station opened in 1889 for firewood traffic, with numerous sawmills located in the immediate area, with passenger facilities were first provided in 1890. In 1916 the yard was rebuilt with a new platform and signal box, three road yard, and a goods siding. The station was closed to all traffic except wagon loads in 1965, and today there is little left of the station.

References

Disused railway stations in Victoria (Australia)